Sidney Lord (born 20 October 1886, date of death unknown) was an Australian cricketer. He played one first-class match for Tasmania in 1914/15.

See also
 List of Tasmanian representative cricketers

References

External links
 

1886 births
Year of death missing
Australian cricketers
Tasmania cricketers
Cricketers from Tasmania
Place of birth missing